Alborz County is in Qazvin province, Iran. The capital of the county is the city of Alvand. At the 2006 census, the county's population was 182,046 in 47,046 households. The following census in 2011 counted 203,276 people in 59,174 households. At the 2016 census, the county's population was 242,865 in 75,922 households.

Administrative divisions

The population history and structural changes of Alborz County's administrative divisions over three consecutive censuses are shown in the following table. The latest census shows two districts, four rural districts, and four cities.

References

 

Counties of Qazvin Province